Alvvays (pronounced "always") is a Canadian indie pop band formed in 2011, originating from Charlottetown, Prince Edward Island, and currently based in Toronto, Ontario. It consists of Molly Rankin (vocals and guitar), Kerri MacLellan (keyboards), Alec O'Hanley (guitars), Abbey Blackwell (bass), and Sheridan Riley (drums). Their self-titled debut album, released in 2014, topped the US college charts. Their second studio album, Antisocialites, was released on September 8, 2017, and won the Juno Award for Alternative Album of the Year at the Juno Awards of 2018. Both albums were short-listed for the Polaris Music Prize. Their third album, Blue Rev, was released on October 7, 2022.

History

Formation and early years (2011–2015)

Molly Rankin, the group's singer-songwriter, is the daughter of John Morris Rankin, a fiddler with the Celtic folk family collective the Rankin Family, who enjoyed international success in the 1990s. Rankin grew up in Mabou, Nova Scotia, writing music with her neighbour, keyboardist Kerri MacLellan. She later met guitarist and partner Alec O'Hanley at a concert. With the help of O'Hanley, Rankin quietly released a solo extended play titled She in 2010. Alvvays was formed the following year, with Rankin recruiting MacLellan, O'Hanley, drummer Phil MacIsaac and bassist Brian Murphy. Rankin picked the name Alvvays because it had a "shred of sentiment and nostalgia." The spelling of the band name was due to the fact that there was already a band named Always signed to Sony.

The band members moved to Toronto and secured jobs that allowed them to tour occasionally. The group toured extensively as supporting acts for bands such as Peter Bjorn and John and the Decemberists. Their self-titled debut studio album, Alvvays, was recorded in Calgary with Chad VanGaalen in March 2013; Graham Walsh helped track the album while John Agnello helped mix it.

Alvvays were signed to Polyvinyl Records (US) on the strength of their performances at SXSW (South by Southwest) and online response to the demo of their single "Adult Diversion". The album Alvvays was released by Royal Mountain Records (Canada), Polyvinyl Records (US) and Transgressive Records (Europe) in July 2014. Simon Vozick-Levinson, writing in Rolling Stone, called the album an "indie-pop wonder". Alvvays went to #1 on US college charts on August 5, 2014; in November that year they performed in Los Angeles with another Canadian band, Absolutely Free.

"Archie, Marry Me" became a minor hit. The single for "Archie, Marry Me" featured the B-side "Underneath Us" which was recorded after the eponymous album.

The group toured heavily in support of their debut, including slots at Glastonbury 2015 and Coachella Valley Music and Arts Festival in 2016.

The debut album was nominated to the shortlist of the 2015 Polaris Music Prize. They performed at that year's gala with the Toronto Symphony Orchestra. At the Juno Awards of 2015, the band was nominated as Breakthrough Group of the Year, and Alvvays was nominated for Alternative Album of the Year.

Antisocialites (2016–2018)
Alvvays began recording and writing their second studio album in 2015. Several new original songs had been performed throughout 2014 and 2015, including "Your Type" (often the opening song of the show), "New Haircut" (later retitled "Saved By A Waif") and "Hey". In 2016 they added "Not My Baby" and "Dreams" to their performance repertoire.

Following the addition of new songs such as "Plimsoll Punks" as part of live shows in spring 2017, Alvvays released a teaser clip of a song called "In Undertow" from their second album, Antisocialites. Along with songs performed at previous shows, new songs for this record included "Already Gone", "Forget About Life", "In Undertow", "Lollipop (Ode to Jim)" and "Saved by a Waif". The album was released on September 8, 2017. A North American and European tour in support of the album was announced for autumn 2017. In 2016, Phil MacIsaac left the music industry for a career in graphic design; he was replaced by Sheridan Riley. A second UK tour in spring 2018 was announced in September 2017.

On September 16, 2017, at a show in Antwerp, a male audience member jumped on stage and attempted to kiss singer Molly Rankin. Ken Veerman, the director at Trix, the show’s venue, apologized on Facebook.

In 2018 the band received a SOCAN Songwriting Prize nomination for the song "Dreams Tonite", and Antisocialites was shortlisted for the 2018 Polaris Music Prize. At the Juno Awards of 2018, Alvvays was nominated as Group of the Year and Antisocialites won the Juno Award for Alternative Album of the Year.

Blue Rev (2021–present) 

Between 2019 and 2022, members of Alvvays largely stayed out of the public eye, rarely posting on social media. The radio silence led to memes and rumors the band had disbanded. Bassist and founding member Brian Murphy left the band in 2021. Alvvays released "Pharmacist", the first single from their third album Blue Rev, on July 6, 2022. Blue Rev was released on October 7, 2022.

Musical style and influences
Alvvays' music has been described as jangle pop by the music press and its members. According to Rankin, the band's emphasis is primarily on strong melodies rather than for a specific genre. The band has been compared to Camera Obscura; Rankin noted she shared vocalist Tracyanne Campbell's "fondness for the pathetic perspective." Rankin sought inspiration from Stephin Merritt, frontman of the Magnetic Fields, appreciating the honest but lighthearted nature of his lyrics. Rankin's personal influences include the Magnetic Fields, Teenage Fanclub, Dolly Mixture, the Smiths, Celine Dion, Pavement, the Primitives, and Oasis. While the band does not have an overt Celtic music sound, Rankin acknowledges that she was immersed in the genre from childhood, and it has a discernible influence on the way she sings and writes melodies.

Members

Current members
 Molly Rankin – vocals, rhythm guitar (2011–present), bass (2022–present)
 Kerri MacLellan – keyboards, backing vocals (2011–present)
 Alec O'Hanley – lead guitar (2011–present)
 Sheridan Riley – drums, percussion, backing vocals (2017–present)
 Abbey Blackwell – bass (2021–present)

Past members
 Phil MacIsaac – drums (2011–2016)
 Brian Murphy – bass guitar (2011–2021)

Discography

Albums

Singles

Music videos
 2013: "Adult Diversion"
 2014: "Archie, Marry Me"
 2014: "Next of Kin"
 2017: "In Undertow"
 2017: "Dreams Tonite"
 2022: "Pharmacist"
 2022: "Easy On Your Own?"
 2022: "Very Online Guy"
 2022: "Belinda Says"
 2022: "After the Earthquake"
 2022: "Many Mirrors"

Notes

References

External links

 
 
 
 

Canadian indie pop groups
Dream pop musical groups
Jangle pop groups
Musical groups from Toronto
Musical groups established in 2011
2011 establishments in Ontario
Juno Award for Alternative Album of the Year winners
Musical groups from Charlottetown